This is a list of ambassadors of the Republic of Nicaragua to individual nations of the world, to international organizations, and to past nations, as well as ambassadors-at-large.

Ambassadors are nominated by the President and confirmed by the Asamblea Nacional de la República de Nicaragua. An ambassador can be appointed during a recess, but can only serve until the end of the next session of national assembly unless subsequently confirmed. Ambassadors serve "at the pleasure of the President", meaning they can be dismissed at any time.

An ambassador may be a career Foreign Service Officer or a political appointee. In most cases, career foreign service officers serve a tour of approximately three years per ambassadorship whereas political appointees customarily tender their resignations upon the inauguration of a new president. As embassies fall under the Ministerio de Relaciones Exteriores de la República de Nicaragua (Chancellery of Nicaragua) jurisdiction, ambassadors answer to the Foreign Ministers of Nicaragua, Denis Moncada or to the President of Nicaragua, Daniel Ortega.

Current Nicaraguan ambassadors

Current Nicaraguan ambassadors to limited recognition states
Current ambassadors from Nicaragua to limited recognition states:

Ambassadors to international organizations
Current ambassadors from Nicaragua to international organizations:

References

External links 
 https://web.archive.org/web/20151004003716/https://www.cancilleria.gob.ni/

 
Lists of Nicaraguan people by occupation
Nicaragua